Clem F. Crowe (October 18, 1903 – April 13, 1983) was an American gridiron football and basketball player and coach. He served as the head football coach at Saint Vincent College (1926–1931), Xavier University (1936–1943), and the University of Iowa (1945), compiling a career college football record of 71–66–5. Crowe was also the head basketball coach at Saint Vincent College (1928–1932), Xavier (1933–1943), and the University of Notre Dame (1944–1945), tallying a career college basketball mark of 152–115. He later coached professional football for the Buffalo Bills and Baltimore Colts of the All-America Football Conference (AAFC), and the Ottawa Rough Riders and BC Lions of the Canadian Football League (CFL).

Playing career

Crowe played college football and basketball at the University of Notre Dame. He earned three letters in basketball and was a basketball All-American. He also earned three letters in football under Coach Knute Rockne. Crowe played football from 1923 to 1925 and was a two-time All-American. He played end for Notre Dame's "Seven Mule" team and was named Notre Dame's football captain in 1925.

College coaching career
After graduation, Crowe took a position as a coach at Saint Vincent College in Latrobe, Pennsylvania. There he coached the football team from 1926 to 1931, compiling a record of 23–27–3, and the basketball team from 1928–1932, tallying a 41–31 mark in four seasons.

Crowe left Saint Vincent in 1932 and took a job at Xavier University. He coached the Xavier basketball team from 1933 to 1943 and had a 96–79 record in ten seasons. He also coached the Xavier football team from 1935 to 1943 and compiled a 46–32–2 record. In addition, Crowe was a baseball coach and a golf coach at Xavier. He was inducted into the Xavier University Athletics Hall of Fame in 1994.

Crowe left Xavier in 1943 and returned to his alma mater. He was an assistant football coach at Notre Dame in 1944 and the head basketball coach for the 1944–45 season.

In 1945, Crowe was hired on an interim basis as the 17th head football coach at the University of Iowa while Iowa's regular coach, Eddie Anderson, was serving with the U.S. Army Medical Corps during World War II. Following Crowe's one season, in which he had a 2–7 record, Anderson returned, and Crowe left the Iowa football program.

Professional coaching career
Crowe resurfaced in 1949 as the head coach of the Buffalo Bills of the All-America Football Conference, going 4–1–1. When the Buffalo franchise folded, he left to coach the Baltimore Colts in 1950. He had a 1–11 record, and after the season, that franchise folded as well.

Art Donovan had this to say of Crowe, his coach during his 1950 rookie season with the Colts: "This sonofabitch was crazy, and my first training camp immediately became one of the worst experiences of my life. First of all, Crowe must have had 150 players in camp, and all we did was scrimmage. No drills. No chalk talk. No run-throughs of plays. Just hot, humid, bone-breaking, full-pad scrimmages.... For my first couple of days in camp I wasn't even issued pads."

Crowe then headed north to Canada and agreed to coach the Ottawa Rough Riders of the Canadian Football League in 1951. In his first season in Ottawa, he led the Rough Riders to the Grey Cup. He later left Ottawa for the BC Lions. He was a head coach in Vancouver from 1956 to 1958. Crowe died in Rochester, New York on April 13, 1983 at age 79.

Head coaching record

College football

Professional football

Notes

References

External links

 

1903 births
1983 deaths
Basketball coaches from Indiana
American football ends
Forwards (basketball)
Baltimore Colts (1947–1950) coaches
Iowa Hawkeyes football coaches
Notre Dame Fighting Irish football coaches
Notre Dame Fighting Irish football players
Notre Dame Fighting Irish men's basketball coaches
Notre Dame Fighting Irish men's basketball players
Saint Vincent Bearcats football coaches
Xavier Musketeers athletic directors
Xavier Musketeers football coaches
Xavier Musketeers men's basketball coaches
College men's basketball head coaches in the United States
Sportspeople from Lafayette, Indiana
Players of American football from Indiana
Basketball players from Indiana
Educators from Indiana
American men's basketball players